Azmi Mohamed Megahed (15 April 1950 – 12 September 2020) was an Egyptian volleyball player. He competed in the men's tournament at the 1976 Summer Olympics.

Biography
Born in Dakahlia, Megahed played for Zamalek SC and Egypt national team for 16 years. He won the best African player award in 1974. He also won many individual, domestic and continental awards as a player and manager. He later became a board member of Zamalek SC, then worked as a political commentator and TV presenter at "Al Assema TV". His son, Amir Azmy, became a footballer.

He died on 12 September 2020 in a hospital in Cairo due to COVID-19 during the pandemic in Egypt.

References

External links

1950 births
2020 deaths
People from Dakahlia Governorate
Egyptian men's volleyball players
Olympic volleyball players of Egypt
Volleyball players at the 1976 Summer Olympics
Deaths from the COVID-19 pandemic in Egypt